Bohemia Township is a civil township of Ontonagon County in the U.S. state of Michigan.  As of the 2020 census, the population was 75.

Communities
Algonquin was established in 1848, and had a post office from 1848 until 1867.
Rousseau is an unincorporated community in the township.

Geography

Demographics

As of the census of 2000, there were 77 people, 43 households, and 22 families residing in the township. The population density was 0.8 per square mile (0.3/km2). There were 175 housing units at an average density of 1.9 per square mile (0.7/km2). The racial makeup of the township was 97.40% White, 1.30% from other races, and 1.30% from two or more races. Hispanic or Latino of any race were 1.30% of the population. 47.8% were of Finnish, 11.9% English, 10.4% American and 10.4% Irish ancestry according to Census 2000.

There were 43 households, out of which 9.3% had children under the age of 18 living with them, 51.2% were married couples living together, and 48.8% were non-families. 39.5% of all households were made up of individuals, and 20.9% had someone living alone who was 65 years of age or older. The average household size was 1.79 and the average family size was 2.32.

In the township the population was spread out, with 5.2% under the age of 18, 5.2% from 18 to 24, 24.7% from 25 to 44, 37.7% from 45 to 64, and 27.3% who were 65 years of age or older. The median age was 52 years. For every 100 females, there were 108.1 males. For every 100 females age 18 and over, there were 97.3 males.

The median income for a household in the township was $31,875, and the median income for a family was $37,083. Males had a median income of $29,688 versus $40,833 for females. The per capita income for the township was $23,775. There were no families and 9.6% of the population living below the poverty line, including no under eighteens and none of those over 64.

References

Notes

Sources

Townships in Ontonagon County, Michigan
Townships in Michigan
Michigan populated places on Lake Superior